Santiago Pérez Quiroz Airport (  is an airport serving Arauca, the capital of the Arauca Department in Colombia.

Airlines and destinations

See also
Transport in Colombia
List of airports in Colombia

References

External links 
OurAirports - Arauca
SkyVector - Arauca

Airports in Colombia
Buildings and structures in Arauca Department